Qin Shi Huang (259–210 BC) was the founder of the Qin dynasty and the first emperor of a unified China. Rather than maintain the title of "king" ( wáng) borne by the previous Shang and Zhou rulers, he ruled as the First Emperor of the Qin dynasty from 221 to 210 BC. His self-invented title "emperor" would continue to be borne by Chinese rulers for the next two millennia. Historically, he was often portrayed as a tyrannical ruler and strict Legalist, in part from the Han dynasty's scathing assessments of him. Since the mid 20th-century, scholars have begun to question this evaluation, inciting considerable discussion on the actual nature of his policies and reforms. Regardless, according to sinologist Michael Loewe "few would contest the view that the achievements of his reign have exercised a paramount influence on the whole of China's subsequent history, marking the start of an epoch that closed in 1911".

Born in the Zhao state capital Handan, as Ying Zheng or Zhao Zheng, his parents were King Zhuangxiang of Qin and Lady Zhao. The wealthy merchant Lü Buwei assisted him in succeeding his father as the ruler of Qin, after which he became Zheng, King of Qin. By the age of 38 in 221 BC, he had conquered all the other Warring States and unified all of China, and he ascended the throne as China's first emperor. 

During his reign, his generals greatly expanded the size of the Chinese state: campaigns south of Chu permanently added the Yue lands of Hunan and Guangdong to the Chinese cultural orbit, and campaigns in Inner Asia conquered the Ordos Loop from the nomadic Xiongnu, although the Xiongnu later rallied under Modu Chanyu.

Qin Shi Huang also worked with his minister Li Si to enact major economic and political reforms aimed at the standardization of the diverse practices of the earlier Chinese states. He is traditionally said to have banned and burned many books and executed scholars. His public works projects included the incorporation of diverse state walls into a single Great Wall of China and a massive new national road system, as well as his city-sized mausoleum guarded by a life-sized Terracotta Army. He ruled until his death in 210 BC, during his fifth tour of Eastern China.

Origin of name 

Modern Chinese sources often give the personal name of Qin Shi Huang as Ying Zheng, with Ying taken as the surname and Zheng the given name. However, in ancient China, the naming convention differed, and the clan name Zhao, the place where he was born and raised, may be used as the surname. Unlike modern Chinese names, the nobles of ancient China had two distinct surnames: the ancestral name comprised a larger group descended from a prominent ancestor, usually said to have lived during the time of the Three Sovereigns and Five Emperors of Chinese legend, and the clan name comprised a smaller group that showed a branch's current fief or recent title. The ancient practice was to list men's names separatelySima Qian's "Basic Annals of the First Emperor of Qin" introduces him as "given the name Zheng and the surname Zhao"or to combine the clan surname with the personal name: Sima's account of Chu describes the sixteenth year of the reign of King Kaolie as "the time when Zhao Zheng was enthroned as King of Qin". However, since modern Chinese surnames (despite usually descending from clan names) use the same character as the old ancestral names, it is much more common in modern Chinese sources to see the emperor's personal name written as Ying Zheng, using the ancestral name of the Ying family.

The rulers of Qin had styled themselves kings from the time of King Huiwen in 325 BC. Upon his ascension, Zheng became known as the King of Qin or King Zheng of Qin. This title made him the nominal equal of the rulers of Shang and of Zhou, the last of whose kings had been deposed by King Zhaoxiang of Qin in 256 BC.

Following the surrender of Qi in 221 BC, King Zheng reunited all of the lands of the former Kingdom of Zhou. Rather than maintain his rank as king, however, he created a new title of huángdì (emperor) for himself. This new title combined two titleshuáng of the mythical Three Sovereigns (Sān Huáng) and the dì of the legendary Five Emperors (Wŭ Dì) of Chinese prehistory. The title was intended to appropriate some of the prestige of the Yellow Emperor, whose cult was popular in the later Warring States period and who was considered to be a founder of the Chinese people. King Zheng chose the new regnal name of First Emperor (Shǐ Huángdì, formerly transcribed as Shih Huang-ti) on the understanding that his successors would be successively titled the "Second Emperor", "Third Emperor", and so on through the generations. (In fact, the scheme lasted only as long as his immediate heir, the Second Emperor.) The new title carried religious overtones. For that reason, Sinologistsstarting with Peter Boodberg or Edward Schafersometimes translate it as "thearch" and the First Emperor as the First Thearch.

The First Emperor intended that his realm would remain intact through the ages but, following its overthrow and replacement by Han after his death, it became customary to prefix his title with Qin. Thus:
 , Qín or Ch‘in, "of Qin"
 , Shǐ or Shih, "first"
 , Huángdì or Huang-ti, "emperor", a new term coined from
 , Huáng or Huang, literally "shining" or "splendid" and formerly most usually applied "as an epithet of Heaven", a title of the Three Sovereigns, the high god of the Zhou
 , Dì or Ti, the high god of the Shang, possibly composed of their divine ancestors, and used by the Zhou as a title of the legendary Five Emperors, particularly the Yellow Emperor

Following his elevation as emperor, both Zheng's personal name  and possibly its homophone  became taboo. The First Emperor also arrogated the first-person Chinese pronoun  (OC *lrəm’, mod. zhèn) for his exclusive use and in 212 BC began calling himself The Immortal  OC *Tin-niŋ, mod. Zhēnrén, lit. "True Man"). Others were to address him as "Your Majesty"  mod. Bìxià, lit. "Beneath the Palace Steps") in person and "Your Highness" in writing.

Birth and parentage
According to the Records of the Grand Historian, written by Sima Qian during the Han dynasty, the first emperor was the eldest son of the Qin prince Yiren, who later became King Zhuangxiang of Qin. Prince Yiren at that time was residing at the court of Zhao, serving as a hostage to guarantee the armistice between the Qin and Zhao states. Prince Yiren had fallen in love at first sight with a concubine of Lü Buwei, a rich merchant from the State of Wey. Lü consented for her to be Yiren's wife, who then became known as Lady Zhao (Zhao Ji) after the state of Zhao. He was given the name Zhao Zheng, the name Zheng came from his month of birth Zhengyue, the first month of the Chinese lunar calendar; the clan name of Zhao came from his father's lineage and was unrelated to either his mother's name or the location of his birth. (Song Zhong says that his birthday, significantly, was on the first day of Zhengyue.) Lü Buwei's machinations later helped Yiren become King Zhuangxiang of Qin in 250 BC. 

However, the Records of the Grand Historian also claimed that the first emperor was not the actual son of Prince Yiren but that of Lü Buwei. According to this account, when Lü Buwei introduced the dancing girl to the prince, she was Lü Buwei's concubine and had already become pregnant by him, and the baby was born after an unusually long period of pregnancy. According to translations of the Annals of Lü Buwei, Zhao Ji gave birth to the future emperor in the city of Handan in 259 BC, the first month of the 48th year of King Zhaoxiang of Qin.

The idea that the emperor was an illegitimate child, widely believed throughout Chinese history, contributed to the generally negative view of the First Emperor. However, a number of modern scholars have doubted this account of his birth. Sinologist Derk Bodde wrote: "There is good reason for believing that the sentence describing this unusual pregnancy is an interpolation added to the Shih-chi by an unknown person in order to slander the First Emperor and indicate his political as well as natal illegitimacy". John Knoblock and Jeffrey Riegel, in their translation of Lü Buwei's Spring and Autumn Annals, call the story "patently false, meant both to libel Lü and to cast aspersions on the First Emperor". Claiming Lü Buwei—a merchant—as the First Emperor's biological father was meant to be especially disparaging, since later Confucian society regarded merchants as the lowest of all social classes.

Reign as the King of Qin

Regency

In 246 BC, when King Zhuangxiang died after a short reign of just three years, he was succeeded on the throne by his 13-year-old son. At the time, Zhao Zheng was still young, so Lü Buwei acted as the regent prime minister of the State of Qin, which was still waging war against the other six states. Nine years later, in 235 BC, Zhao Zheng assumed full power after Lü Buwei was banished for his involvement in a scandal with Queen Dowager Zhao.

Zhao Chengjiao, the Lord Chang'an, was Zhao Zheng's legitimate half-brother, by the same father but from a different mother. After Zhao Zheng inherited the throne, Chengjiao rebelled at Tunliu and surrendered to the state of Zhao. Chengjiao's remaining retainers and families were executed by Zhao Zheng.

Lao Ai's attempted coup
As King Zheng grew older, Lü Buwei became fearful that the boy king would discover his liaison with his mother, Lady Zhao. He decided to distance himself and look for a replacement for the queen dowager. He found a man named Lao Ai. According to The Record of Grand Historian, Lao Ai was disguised as a eunuch by plucking his beard. Later Lao Ai and queen Zhao Ji got along so well that they secretly had two sons together. Lao Ai was ennobled as Marquis Lào Ǎi, and was showered with riches. Lao Ai's had been planning to replace King Zheng with one of his own sons, but during a dinner party he was heard bragging about being the young king's stepfather. In 238 BC, while the king was travelling to the former capital, Yong, Lao Ai seized the queen mother's seal and mobilized an army in a coup attempt. When notified of the rebellion, King Zheng ordered Lü Buwei to let Lord Changping and Lord Changwen attack Lao Ai. Although the royal army killed hundreds of rebels at the capital, Lao Ai successfully fled the battlefield.

A price of 1 million copper coins was placed on Lao Ai's head if he was taken alive or half a million if dead. Lao Ai's supporters were captured and beheaded; then Lao Ai was tied up and torn to five pieces by horse carriages, while his entire family was executed to the third degree. The two hidden sons were also killed, while mother Zhao Ji was placed under house arrest until her death many years later. Lü Buwei drank a cup of poison wine and committed suicide in 235 BC. Ying Zheng then assumed full power as the King of the Qin state. Replacing Lü Buwei, Li Si became the new chancellor.

First assassination attempt

King Zheng and his troops continued their conquest of the neighbouring states. The state of Yan was no match for the Qin states: small and weak, it had already been harassed frequently by Qin soldiers.  Crown Prince Dan of Yan plotted an assassination attempt against King Zheng, recruiting Jing Ke and Qin Wuyang for the mission in 227 BC. 

The assassins gained access to King Zheng by pretending a diplomatic gifting of goodwill: a map of Dukang and the severed head of Fan Wuji. Qin Wuyang stepped forward first to present the map case but was overcome by fear. Jing Ke then advanced with both gifts, while explaining that his partner was trembling because "[he] had never set eyes on the Son of Heaven". When the dagger unrolled from the map, the king leapt to his feet and struggled to draw his sword -- none of his courtiers was allowed to carry arms in his presence. Jing Ke stabbed at the king but missed, and King Zheng slashed Jing Ke's thigh. In desperation, Jing Ke threw the dagger but missed again. He surrendered after a brief fight in which he was further injured. The Yan state was conquered in its entirety five years later.

Second assassination attempt

Gao Jianli was a close friend of Jing Ke, and wanted to avenge his death. As a famous lute player, he was summoned to play for King Zheng. Someone in the palace recognized him and guessed his plans. Reluctant to kill such a skilled musician, the emperor ordered his eyes put out, then proceeded with the performance. The king praised Gao Jianli's playing and even allowed him closer. The lute had been weighted with a slab of lead, and Gao Jianli swung it at the king but missed. The second assassination attempt had failed; Gao Jianli was executed shortly after.

Unification of China

In 230 BC, King Zheng unleashed the final campaigns of the Warring States period, setting out to conquer the remaining independent kingdoms one by one.

The first to fall was Hán (韓; sometimes called Hann to distinguish it from the Hàn 漢 of Han dynasty), in 230 BC. Then Qin took advantage of natural disasters in 229 BC to invade and conquer Zhào, where King Zheng had been born. He now took deadly revenge on those in Zhào who had mistreated him as a child hostage there.

Qin armies conquered Zhao in 228 BC, the northern country of Yan in 226 BC, the small state of Wei in 225 BC, and then Chu, the largest state and greatest challenge, in 223 BC.

In 222 BC, the last remnants of Yan and the royal family were captured in Liaodong in the northeast. The only independent kingdom was Qi in the far east, in what is now the Shandong peninsula. The young king of Qi desperately sent 200,000 men to defend his western borders, but in 221 BC, the Qin armies invaded from the north, captured the king, and annexed Qi. 

By 221 BC, all Chinese lands were unified under one powerful ruler, and in the course of conquest, Qin had standardized trade, communication, currency, and language. In that same year, King Zheng proclaimed himself with the new title "First Emperor" (始皇帝, Shǐ Huángdì), to symbolize how far he had surpassed the achievements of the old Zhou Dynasty rulers. The Emperor ordered the Heshibi to be made into the Imperial Seal, the Heirloom Seal of the Realm. It was inscribed by Sun Shou with the device of Prime Minister Li Si: "Having received the Mandate from Heaven, may he lead a long and prosperous life". The Seal became a sigil passed from emperor to emperor.

During the year 215 BC, in an attempt to expand Qin territory, he ordered military campaigns against the Xiongnu nomads in the North, led by the efficient General Meng Tian who successfully routed the Xiongnu from the Ordos region, setting the ancient foundations for the construction of the Great Wall of China. 

In the South, further military expansion continued in campaigns against the Yue tribes, with various regions annexed to what is now Guangdong province, as well as some that are part of Vietnam today.

Reign as Emperor of Qin

Administrative reforms

In an attempt to avoid a recurrence of the political chaos of the Warring States period, Qin Shi Huang and his prime minister Li Si worked to completely abolish the feudal system of loose alliances and federations. They organized the empire into administrative units and subunits: first 36 (later 40) commanderies (郡, Jùn), then counties (縣, Xiàn), townships (鄉, Xiāng) and hundred-family units (里, Li, roughly corresponding to modern-day subdistricts and communities). People assigned to these units would no longer be identified by their native region or former feudal state, for example "Chu person" (楚人, Chu rén). Appointments were to be based on merit instead of hereditary rights.

Economic reforms

Qin Shi Huang and Li Si unified China economically by standardizing the Chinese weights and measures. Wagon axles were prescribed a standard length to facilitate road transport. The emperor also developed an extensive network of roads and canals for trade and communication. The currencies of the different states were standardized to the Ban liang coin (半兩, Bàn Liǎng). Perhaps most importantly, the Chinese script was unified. Under Li Si, the seal script of the state of Qin became the official standard, and the Qin script itself was simplified through removal of variant forms. This did away with all the regional scripts to form a universal written language for all of China, despite the diversity of spoken dialects.

Philosophy

While the previous Warring States era was one of constant warfare, it was also considered the golden age of free thought. Qin Shi Huang eliminated the Hundred Schools of Thought, which included Confucianism and other philosophies. With all other philosophies banned, legalism became the mandatory ideology of the Qin dynasty. 

Beginning 213 BC, at the instigation of Li Si and to avoid scholars' comparisons of his reign with the past, Qin Shi Huang ordered most existing books to be burned, with the exception of those on astrology, agriculture, medicine, divination, and the history of the State of Qin. This would also serve to further the ongoing reformation of the writing system by removing examples of obsolete scripts. Owning the Book of Songs or the Classic of History was to be punished especially severely. According to the later Records of the Grand Historian, the following year Qin Shi Huang had some 460 scholars buried alive for possessing the forbidden books. The emperor's oldest son Fusu criticised him for this act. The emperor's own library did retain copies of the forbidden books, but most of these were destroyed when Xiang Yu burned the palaces of Xianyang in 206 BC.

Recent research suggests that this "burying Confucian scholars alive" is a Confucian martyrs' legend. More probably, the emperor ordered the execution (坑 kēng) of a group of alchemists who had deceived him. In the subsequent Han dynasty, the Confucian scholars, who had served the Qin loyally, used this incident to distance themselves from the failed regime. Kong Anguo (孔安國 c. 165 – c. 74 BC), a descendant of Confucius, described the alchemists (方士 fāngshì) as Confucianists (儒 rú) and entwined the martyrs' legend with his story of discovering the lost Confucian books behind a demolished wall in his ancestral house.

Qin Shi Huang also followed the theory of the five elements: fire, water, earth, wood, and metal. It was believed that the royal house of the previous dynasty Zhou had ruled by the power of fire, associated with the colour red. The new Qin dynasty must be ruled by the next element on the list, which is water, Zhao Zheng's birth element. Water was represented by the colour black, and black became the preferred colour for Qin garments, flags, and pennants. Other associations include north as the cardinal direction, the winter season and the number six.

Third assassination attempt

In 230 BC, the state of Qin had defeated the state of Han. In 218 BC, a former Han aristocrat named Zhang Liang swore revenge on Qin Shi Huang. He sold his valuables and hired a strongman assassin, building a heavy metal cone weighing 120 jin (roughly 160 lb or 97 kg). The two men hid among the bushes along the emperor's route over a mountain during Qin Shi Huangdi's third imperial tour. At a signal, the muscular assassin hurled the cone at the first carriage and shattered it. However, the emperor was travelling with two identical carriages to baffle attackers, and he was actually in the second carriage. Thus the attempt failed, though both men were able to escape the subsequent manhunt.

Public works

Great Wall

Numerous state walls had been built during the previous four centuries, many of them closing gaps between river defences and impassable cliffs. To impose centralized rule and prevent the resurgence of feudal lords, the Emperor ordered the destruction of walls between the former states, which were now internal walls dividing the empire. 

However, to defend against the northern Xiongnu nomadic tribes, who had beaten back repeated campaigns against them, he ordered new walls to connect the fortifications along the empire's northern frontier. Hundreds of thousands of workers were mobilized, and an unknown number died, to build this precursor to the current Great Wall of China. Transporting building materials was difficult, so builders always tried to use local materials: rock over mountain ranges, rammed earth over the plains. "Build and move on" was a guiding principle, implying that the Wall was not a permanently fixed border. There are no surviving records specifying the length and course of the Qin walls, which have largely eroded away over the centuries.

Lingqu Canal

In 214 BC the Emperor began the project of a major canal allowing water transport between north and south China, originally for military supplies. The canal, 34 kilometres in length, links two of China's major waterways, the Xiang River flowing into the Yangtze and the Li Jiang flowing into the Pearl River. The canal aided Qin's expansion to the south-west. It is considered one of the three great feats of ancient Chinese engineering, along with the Great Wall and the Sichuan Dujiangyan Irrigation System.

Elixir of life

As he grew old, Qin Shi Huang desperately sought the fabled elixir of life which supposedly confers immortality. In his obsessive quest, he fell prey to many fraudulent elixirs. He visited Zhifu Island three times in his search.

In one case he sent Xu Fu, a Zhifu islander, with ships carrying hundreds of young men and women in search of the mystical Penglai mountain. They sought Anqi Sheng, a thousand-year-old magician who had supposedly invited Qin Shi Huang during a chance meeting during his travels. The expedition never returned, perhaps for fear of the consquences of failure. Legends claim that they reached Japan and colonized it. 

It is also possible that the Emperor's book burning, which exempted alchemical works, could be seen as an attempt to focus the minds of the best scholars on the Emperor's quest. Some of those buried alive were alchemists, and this could have been a means of testing their death-defying abilities. 

The emperor built a system of tunnels and passageways to each of his over 200 palaces, because traveling unseen would supposedly keep him safe from evil spirits.

Final years

Death

In 211 BC a large meteor is said to have fallen in Dongjun in the lower reaches of the Yellow River, and someone inscribed the seditious words "The First Emperor will die and his land will be divided". The Emperor sent an imperial secretary to investigate this prophecy. No one would confess to the deed, so all living nearby were put to death, and the stone was pulverized.

During his fifth tour of Eastern China, the Emperor became seriously ill in Pingyuanjin (Pingyuan County, Shandong), and died in July or August 210 BC at the palace in Shaqiu prefecture (沙丘平台, Shāqiū Píngtái), about two months travel from the capital Xianyang, at the age of 49. 

The cause of Qin Shi Huang's death remains unknown, though he had been worn down by his many years of rule. One hypothesis holds that he was poisoned by an elixir containing mercury, given him by his court alchemists and physicians in his quest for immortality.

Succession
Upon witnessing the Emperor's death, Prime Minister Li Si feared the news could trigger a general uprising during the two months' travel for the imperial entourage to return to the capital Xianyang. Li Si decided to hide the emperor's death: the only members of the entourage to be informed were a younger son, Ying Huhai, the eunuch Zhao Gao, and five or six favourite eunuchs. Li Si ordered carts of rotten fish to be carried before and behind the wagon of the Emperor, to cover the foul smell of his body decomposing in the summer heat. Pretending he was alive behind the wagon's shade, they changed his clothes daily, brought food, and pretended to carry message to and from him.

After they reached Xianyang, the death of the Emperor was announced. Qin Shi Huang had not liked to talk about his death and had never written a will. Although his eldest son Fusu was first in line to succeed him as emperor, Li Si and the chief eunuch Zhao Gao conspired to kill Fusu, who was in league with their enemy, general Meng Tian. Meng Tian's brother, a senior minister, had once punished Zhao Gao. Li Si and Zhao Gao forged a letter from Qin Shi Huang commanding Fusu and General Meng to commit suicide. The plan worked, and the younger son Hu Hai started his brief reign as the Second Emperor, later known as Qin Er Shi or "Second Generation Qin".

Family

The following are some family members of Qin Shi Huang:
 Parents
 King Zhuangxiang of Qin
 Queen Dowager Zhao
 Half-siblings:
 Chengjiao, legitimate paternal half brother from a different mother Lord of Chang'an
 Two illegitimate maternal half-brothers born to Queen Dowager Zhao and Lao Ai.
 Children:
 Fusu, Crown Prince (1st son)
 Gao
 Jianglü
 Huhai, later Qin Er Shi (18th son)

Qin Shi Huang had about 50 children (about 30 sons and 15 daughters), but most of their names are unknown. He had numerous concubines but appeared to have never named an empress.

Legacy

Mausoleum

The Chinese historian Sima Qian, writing a century after the First Emperor's death, wrote that it took 700,000 men to construct the emperor's mausoleum. British historian John Man points out that this figure is larger than the population of any city in the world at that time and he calculates that the foundations could have been built by 16,000 men in two years. While Sima Qian never mentioned the terracotta army, the statues were discovered by a group of farmers digging wells on 29 March 1974. The soldiers were created with a series of mix-and-match clay molds and then further individualized by the artists' hand. Han Purple was also used on some of the warriors.
There are around 6,000 Terracotta Warriors and their purpose was to protect the Emperor in the afterlife from evil spirits. Also among the army are chariots and 40,000 real bronze weapons.

One of the first projects which the young king accomplished while he was alive was the construction of his own tomb. In 215 BC Qin Shi Huang ordered General Meng Tian to begin its construction with the assistance of 300,000 men. Other sources suggest that he ordered 720,000 unpaid laborers to build his tomb according to his specifications. Again, given John Man's observation regarding populations at the time (see paragraph above), these historical estimates are debatable. The main tomb (located at ) containing the emperor has yet to be opened and there is evidence suggesting that it remains relatively intact. Sima Qian's description of the tomb includes replicas of palaces and scenic towers, "rare utensils and wonderful objects", 100 rivers made with mercury, representations of "the heavenly bodies", and crossbows rigged to shoot anyone who tried to break in. The tomb was built at the foot of Mount Li, 30 kilometers away from Xi'an. Modern archaeologists have located the tomb, and have inserted probes deep into it. The probes revealed abnormally high quantities of mercury, some 100 times the naturally occurring rate, suggesting that some parts of the legend are credible. Secrets were maintained, as most of the workmen who built the tomb were killed.

Reputation and assessment

Traditional Chinese historiography almost always portrayed the First Emperor of the Chinese unified states as a brutal tyrant who had an obsessive fear of assassination. Ideological antipathy towards the Legalist State of Qin was established as early as 266 BC, when Confucian philosopher Xunzi disparaged it. Later Confucian historians condemned the emperor, alleging that he burned the classics and buried Confucian scholars alive.  They eventually compiled a list of the Ten Crimes of Qin to highlight his tyrannical actions.

The famous Han poet and statesman Jia Yi concluded his essay The Faults of Qin (過秦論, Guò Qín Lùn) with what was to become the standard Confucian judgment of the reasons for Qin's collapse. Jia Yi's essay, admired as a masterpiece of rhetoric and reasoning, was copied into two great Han histories and has had a far-reaching influence on Chinese political thought as a classic illustration of Confucian theory. He attributed Qin's disintegration to its internal failures. Jia Yi wrote that:

In more modern times, historical assessment of the First Emperor different from traditional Chinese historiography began to emerge. The reassessment was spurred on by the weakness of China in the latter half of the 19th century and early 20th century. At that time some began to regard Confucian traditions as an impediment to China's entry into the modern world, opening the way for changing perspectives.

At a time when foreign nations encroached upon Chinese territory, leading Kuomintang historian Xiao Yishan emphasized the role of Qin Shi Huang in repulsing the northern barbarians, particularly in the construction of the Great Wall.

Another historian, Ma Feibai, published in 1941 a full-length revisionist biography of the First Emperor entitled Qín Shǐ Huángdì Zhuàn, calling him "one of the great heroes of Chinese history". Ma compared him with the contemporary leader Chiang Kai-shek and saw many parallels in the careers and policies of the two men, both of whom he admired. Chiang's Northern Expedition of the late 1920s, which directly preceded the new Nationalist government at Nanjing was compared to the unification brought about by Qin Shi Huang.

With the coming of the Communist Revolution and the establishment of a new, revolutionary regime in 1949, another re-evaluation of the First Emperor emerged as a Marxist critique. This new interpretation of Qin Shi Huang was generally a combination of traditional and modern views, but essentially critical. This is exemplified in the Complete History of China, which was compiled in September 1955 as an official survey of Chinese history. The work described the First Emperor's major steps toward unification and standardisation as corresponding to the interests of the ruling group and the merchant class, not of the nation or the people, and the subsequent fall of his dynasty as a manifestation of the class struggle. The perennial debate about the fall of the Qin Dynasty was also explained in Marxist terms, the peasant rebellions being a revolt against oppression—a revolt which undermined the dynasty, but which was bound to fail because of a compromise with "landlord class elements".

Since 1972, however, a radically different official view of Qin Shi Huang in accordance with Maoist thought has been given prominence throughout China. Hong Shidi's biography Qin Shi Huang initiated the re-evaluation. The work was published by the state press as a mass popular history, and it sold 1.85 million copies within two years. In the new era, Qin Shi Huang was seen as a far-sighted ruler who destroyed the forces of division and established the first unified, centralized state in Chinese history by rejecting the past. Personal attributes, such as his quest for immortality, so emphasized in traditional historiography, were scarcely mentioned. The new evaluations described approvingly how, in his time (an era of great political and social change), he had no compunctions against using violent methods to crush counter-revolutionaries, such as the "industrial and commercial slave owner" chancellor Lü Buwei. However, he was criticized for not being as thorough as he should have been, and as a result, after his death, hidden subversives under the leadership of the chief eunuch Zhao Gao were able to seize power and use it to restore the old feudal order.

To round out this re-evaluation, Luo Siding put forward a new interpretation of the precipitous collapse of the Qin Dynasty in an article entitled "On the Class Struggle During the Period Between Qin and Han" in a 1974 issue of Red Flag, to replace the old explanation. The new theory claimed that the cause of the fall of Qin lay in the lack of thoroughness of Qin Shi Huang's "dictatorship over the reactionaries, even to the extent of permitting them to worm their way into organs of political authority and usurp important posts."

Mao Zedong was reviled for his persecution of intellectuals. On being compared to the First Emperor, Mao boasted:

Tom Ambrose characterises Qin Shi Huang as the founder of "the first police state in history".

 "The Wall and the Books" (""), an acclaimed essay on Qin Shi Huang published by Argentine writer Jorge Luis Borges (1899–1986) in the 1952 collection Other Inquisitions.
 The Emperor's Shadow (1996) – The film focuses on Qin Shi Huang's relationship with the musician Gao Jianli, a friend of the assassin Jing Ke.
 The Emperor and the Assassin (1999) – The film covers much of Ying Zheng's career, recalling his early experiences as a hostage and foreshadowing his dominance over China.
 Hero (2002) – The film stars Jet Li, a nameless assassin who plans an assassination attempt on the King of Qin (Chen Daoming). The film is a fictional re-imagining of the assassination attempt by Jing Ke on Qin Shi Huang.
 Rise of the Great Wall (1986) – a 63-episode Hong Kong TV series chronicling the events from the emperor's birth until his death. Tony Liu played Qin Shi Huang.
 A Step into the Past (2001) – a Hong Kong TVB production based on a science fiction novel by Huang Yi.
 Qin Shi Huang (2002) – a mainland Chinese TV semi-fictionalized series with Zhang Fengyi.
 Kingdom (2006) – a Japanese manga that provides a fictionalized account of the unification of China by Ying Zheng with Li Xin and all the people that contributed to the conquest of the six Warring States.
 Fate/Grand Order (2015), an online, free-to-play role-playing mobile game of the Fate franchise developed by Delightworks and published by Aniplex features Qin Shi Huang as a Ruler class servant.
 First Emperor: The Man Who Made China (2006) – a drama-documentary special about Qin Shi Huang. James Pax played the emperor. It was shown on Channel 4 in the United Kingdom in 2006.
 China's First Emperor (2008) – a special three-hour documentary by The History Channel. Xu Pengkai played Qin Shi Huang.
 The Mummy: Tomb of the Dragon Emperor (2008) – the third of The Mummy trilogy. It happened that after General Ming Guo was killed for touching Zi Yuan, she put a curse on the Emperor and his army.
 Qin Shi Huang is depicted in seventh volume of the manga Record of Ragnarok, fighting Hades. In the manga, he is depicted as a tall slender young man with a cloth covering his eye. He is also shown to be wearing traditional Chinese clothing.

Notes

References

Bibliography

Early 
 Sima Qian ( 91 BC). Records of the Grand Historian

Modern
Books
 
 
 
 
 
 
 
 
 
 
 
 

Articles

Further reading

External links
 Qin Shi Huang at Chinaknowledge
 
 

 
260 BC births
210 BC deaths
3rd-century BC Chinese monarchs
Chinese military leaders
Former theocrats
Founding monarchs
Legalism (Chinese philosophy)
People from Handan
Qin dynasty emperors